Parady is a surname. Notable people with the surname include:

Hersha Parady (born 1945), American actress
Jim Parady (born 1961), American football player and coach

See also
Paradies (disambiguation)
Paradis (disambiguation)
Pardy, a surname